Extraordinary Lords of Session were lay members of the Court of Session in Scotland from 1532 to 1762, and were part of the historical judiciary of Scotland.

When the Court of Session was founded in 1532, it consisted of the Lord President, 14 Ordinary Lords and three or four Extraordinary Lords. The Extraordinary Lords were nominees of the Monarch of Scotland, and did not need to be legally qualified; Extraordinary Lords were unsalaried, and free to sit or not as they pleased. This may have been a device to conciliate the barons, but it facilitated royal interference in the work of the courts, and the Extraordinary Lords tended to sit only in cases where they had a personal interest.

The number of Extraordinary Lords rose to eight in 1553 but, after protest, was reduced to four and continued at around that level until 1723 when it was provided that no future vacancies should be filled. Archbishop Burnet was the last cleric to hold judicial office, being an Extraordinary Lord from 1664 to 1668, and John Hay, 4th Marquess of Tweeddale was the last Extraordinary Lord, holding office from 1721 to 1762. The practice of appointing Extraordinary Lords ceased in 1721, and the office of Extraordinary Lord was abolished by the Section 2 of the Court of Session Act 1723. Section 1 of the same restated that Orindary Lords of Session should be legally qualified.

Extraordinary Lords of Session

1539: William Ruthven, 2nd Lord Ruthven
1539: John, Lord Erskine
1541: William Keith, 4th Earl Marischal
1541: William, Earl of Rothes
1541: Robert Maxwell, 5th Lord Maxwell
1541: John Lindsay, 5th Lord Lindsay
1542: George Seton, 6th Lord Seton
1542: Alexander, Lord Livingston
1542: James Ogilvy, 4th Lord Ogilvy of Airlie
1542: John, Lord Innermeath
1554: Sir Richard Maitland of Lethington
1554: Adam Livingstone of Dunipace
1561: William Keith, 4th Earl Marischal
1561: William Maitland of Lethington
1561: James Balfour, parson of Flisk
1562: John Wood of Tulliedairie
1563: Adam, Bishop of Orkney
1565: Alexander, Bishop of Galloway
1566: Edward Henryson
1566: John Wood of Tulliedairie
1566: Gavin Hamilton, Commendator of Kilwinning
1567: Sir John Wishard of Pitarrow
incomplete list

1641: Archibald, Earl of Argyll
1641: Archibald, Lord Angus
1641: John, Lord Lindsay
1641: John Lord Balmerino
1649: John, Lord Coupar
1649: John Kennedy, 6th Earl of Cassilis
1661: John Lindsay, 17th Earl of Crawford
1661: John, Earl of Rothes
1661: John, Earl of Lauderdale
1662: John Middleton, 1st Earl of Middleton
1664: John Hay, 2nd Earl of Tweeddale
1664: Alexander Burnet, Archbishop of Glasgow
1667: Alexander Bruce, 2nd Earl of Kincardine
1668: James Graham, 2nd Marquess of Montrose
1669: John, Earl of Dunfermline
1673: John, Earl of Atholl
1674: Archibald Campbell, 9th Earl of Argyll
1680: Alexander Stuart, 5th Earl of Moray
1681: William, Earl of Queensberry
1682: James, Earl of Perth
1684: Charles Middleton, 2nd Earl of Middleton
1686: William Douglas-Hamilton, Duke of Hamilton
1686: Patrick, Earl of Strathmore
1693: William Douglas, 1st Duke of Queensberry
1693: William Johnstone, 1st Marquess of Annandale
1693: Patrick, Lord Polwarth, later Earl of Marchmont
1693: William Douglas-Hamilton, Duke of Hamilton
1694: Archibald, Earl of Argyll
1696: James Douglas, 2nd Duke of Queensberry
1699: Hugh Campbell, 3rd Earl of Loudoun
1704: John Campbell, 2nd Duke of Argyll
1708: Archibald, Earl of Ilay
1712: John Murray, 1st Duke of Atholl
1721: John Hay, 4th Marquess of Tweeddale

References

 
Judiciary of Scotland
Lists of judges in Scotland
Court of Session
1532 establishments in Scotland
1762 disestablishments in Great Britain
1532 in law
1762 disestablishments in Scotland